Liuyang Confucius Temple is a Confucian temple located in Liuyang, Hunan.

History
Liuyang Confucius Temple was first built in the Northern Song dynasty (960–1127) by Confucian .

In 1818, the temple was relocated in the present address. In 1843, the temple was rebuilt.

In March 2013, it was listed as a "Major Historical and Cultural Site Protected at the National Level" by the State Council of China.

References

Bibliography
 

Confucian temples in China
Buildings and structures in Liuyang
Tourist attractions in Changsha
1843 establishments in China
Religious buildings and structures completed in 1843
19th-century Confucian temples